Abhaya Wewa, historically Abhayavapi or Bassawak reservoir, is a reservoir in Sri Lanka, built by King Pandukabhaya who ruled in Anuradhapura from 437 BC to 367 BC, after constructing the city.

It was constructed in 380 BC. The dam of the reservoir is 10 m high. The water of the reservoir is also accumulated in the Giritale and Kantalai. Currently, the reservoir is about 255 acres. The embankment of the reservoir is about 5910 feet long and 22 feet high above the sill level of the sluice.

Size

Purpose
Built inside the ancient Anuradhapura, it supplied water to the city population.

History
King Paduwasdeva of Sri Lanka, when married Subaddhakacanna from North India, and her seven brothers also came to Sri Lanka and established their villages. One of the brothers, Anuradha established Anuradhapura where he constructed the first reservoir. The reservoir was expanded by king Pandukabhaya. The reservoir was called Abaya Vapi at that time, in memory of one of King's uncles. The reservoir was used to feed the irrigation system.

See also 

Irrigation works in ancient Sri Lanka
Basawakkulama inscription

References

Irrigation works
Buildings and structures in North Central Province, Sri Lanka
Irrigation in Sri Lanka
Agronomy
Reservoirs in Sri Lanka
Bodies of water of Anuradhapura District
Lakes of Sri Lanka